Gioia Sannitica is a comune (municipality) in the Province of Caserta in the Italian region Campania, located about  northeast of Naples and about  northeast of Caserta.

Gioia Sannitica borders the following municipalities: Alife, Alvignano, Cusano Mutri, Faicchio, Ruviano, San Potito Sannitico.

A hill nearby  is home to a Norman castle, connected to a small village which went depopulated in the 14th–15th centuries.

References

Cities and towns in Campania